Cassiya is one of the most popular sega music groups from Mauritius founded in 1988.

They were most popular in the mid-1990s. Their influence was not limited to their home island; they also influenced sega musicians on Réunion. They formed their own record label, Cassiya Productions.

Discography
 Album d'or (Cassiya Productions, 2000)
 Cassiya, la Suite (2001, includes the single "Le Morne", named after the mountain)

Members
Alain La Fleur
Désiré François
Gérard Louis
Bruno François
Damien Elisa (left group)
Alain Ramanisum (left group for a solo career)
Silvio Ravina (deceased)

Former member
Alain Ramanisum (now has a solo career)

References

External links
Profile at Mondomix

Mauritian sega musical groups
Musical groups established in 1988